"A Toast" was adopted by the North Carolina General Assembly in 1957:

Common uses
The State Toast is used at some functions within the University of North Carolina. The University of North Carolina at Chapel Hill's oldest student organization, the Dialectic and Philanthropic Societies, deliver the toast twice annually.

People inducted into the Order of the Long Leaf Pine become "cultural ambassadors of the state" and "can propose the state toast at any time."

See also
 "The Old North State", North Carolina's state song.

References

North Carolina culture
1957 documents
Drinking culture